The Women's 200m Breaststroke event at the 2007 Pan American Games took  place at the Maria Lenk Aquatic Park in Rio de Janeiro, Brazil, with the final being swum on July 22.

Medalists

Results

Finals

Preliminaries

References
For the Record, Swimming World Magazine, September 2007 (p. 48+49)

Breastroke, Women's 200
2007 in women's swimming